The Man in Blue is a 1937 American drama film directed by Milton Carruth and written by Lester Cole. The film stars Robert Wilcox, Edward Ellis, Nan Grey, Richard Carle, Ralph Morgan, Alma Kruger, and Bill Burrud. The film was released on May 30, 1937, by Universal Pictures.

Plot
When Officer Martin Dunne was ambushed and shot at, he shoots back in self defense and kills Willie Loomis, who the father of Frankie Loomis. Now, Dunne and his wife decide to raise Frankie, who does not know that his foster father killed his real father.

Cast

References

External links
 

1937 films
American drama films
1937 drama films
Universal Pictures films
American black-and-white films
Films with screenplays by Kubec Glasmon
Films directed by Milton Carruth
1930s English-language films
1930s American films